is a city park located in the city of Tōmi in Nagano Prefecture, Japan. This park is also called , which means "lawn park".

1972 establishments in Japan
Parks and gardens in Nagano Prefecture
Tōmi, Nagano